Dirina angolana is a species of corticolous (bark-dwelling), crustose lichen in the family Roccellaceae. Found in Angola, it was formally described as a new species in 2013 by lichenologists Anders Tehler and Damien Ertz. The type specimen was collected by the first author north of Palmeirinhas (Luanda Province). It is only known to occur in Angola, where it grows preferentially on baobab tree trunks, usually near the sea. The species epithet refers to the country of its type locality.

The lichen has a creamy-white thallus with a somewhat roughened surface texture with a thickness of 0.1–0.7 mm. Its apothecia are sessile and have a circular outline, measuring up to 1.5 mm in diameter. Ascospores are 23–30 by 4–5 μm. The expected results of chemical spot tests are: thallus surface C+ (red), medulla C–, and apothecial disc C+ (faint red). It contains the lichen products erythrin, lecanoric acid, and some unidentified substances.

References

angolana
Lichen species
Lichens described in 2013
Lichens of South Tropical Africa